The Nissan Almera is a line of automobiles that has been manufactured by the Japanese car manufacturer Nissan since 1995. For its early generations, the Almera is a compact car (C-segment), essentially being the European export-market version of the Pulsar for the first-generation model (N15), and the Bluebird Sylphy for the second-generation model (N16). Since the third-generation model (N17), the Almera nameplate was repositioned to a subcompact or B-segment saloon based on the V platform. The N17 Almera is marketed globally with the usage of five other nameplates for various markets.

The Almera nameplate has also been used for several other unrelated models, including the South Korean-manufactured Samsung SM3 in various export markets worldwide, and for the second-generation Nissan Bluebird Sylphy in Russia.

First generation (N15; 1995) 

The first Almera rolled off the production line in late 1995, as a replacement for the Nissan Sunny (N14), a nameplate which had been in use for nearly 30 years. The Almera was almost identical to the Nissan Pulsar (N15) sold in Japan, except with different trim options and petrol engine range.

Power came from 1.4-litre GA14DE and 1.6-litre GA16DE petrol and 2.0-litre CD20 diesel engines initially in 1995, but a year into production a 2.0-litre SR20DE-engined GTi was added to the range. The 1.4, 1.6 and 2.0D engines were available in a three- and five-door hatchbacks that were badge engineered versions of the Japanese market Nissan Pulsar Serie or a four-door saloon, whereas the GTi was only available in three-door hatch.

In the UK, the Almera was originally marketed by Nissan as "the car they don't want you to drive". Almost all Almeras sold in the United Kingdom were hatchbacks with three or five doors in contrast to regions such as Ireland, where the saloon version is substantially more commonplace. The level of specification was good, with all models getting power steering, driver airbag, electric mirrors and stereo as standard. Throughout the life of the Almera, many 'special editions' models were available but most of them didn't feature anything above other models.

Pre-facelift 
Typical models offered were as follows, with each market differing in detail:
 1.4 S, LX, GX, Si GA14DE
 1.6 SLX, SR/SRi GA16DE
 2.0 GTi SR20DE
 2.0D GX, SLX CD20

The top versions included 'high-spec' bumpers with foglights (optional on the Si model), alloy wheels from 1996 onwards (Different size and design between Si/SRi 14" and GTi 15"), and rear roof lip spoilers (GTi models sported an integrated brake light, also spoilers were optional on the Si). In later model years there was a profusion of special models and market-specific equipment levels like the Comfort, Ambiente, Esteem, Precision and many others.

The 2.0-litre GTi had an optional, aggressive-looking factory bodykit which included BMW M3-style side skirts and front/rear splitters. Non-bodykit models came with a simpler plastic front splitter. The GTi also featured uprated suspension, front and rear strut braces and a quicker steering rack along with the  2-litre engine.

Facelift 
The Almera received a facelift for the 1998 model year. For the phase 2, the front bumpers were redesigned, front splitters were added on the Si/SRi, and the GTi had all-round body kit as standard (although there was also a delete option available), and now all of the lip spoilers had integrated brake lights. The original telescopic radio aerial was moved from the drivers A-pillar to the rear of the roof and was changed to a "bee-sting" type. On the GTi, the phase 2 headlights and front indicators featured a black surround.

The body kit itself was changed to a more subtle, straight design on the GTi, with the addition of vents on the rear splitter. Due to the high 'casualty rate' of Phase 1 splitters, due to the thin and brittle plastic used, Phase 2 body kits were much sturdier. As such, it is not uncommon to find Phase 1 GTi's with Phase 2 bumpers or no splitter at all.

Towards the end of production around the start of 1999, the GTi models came with all optional extras as standard from the factory such as ABS, A/C, updated interior trim, front seat pockets and so forth.

Second generation (N16; 2000) 

Launched in January 2000, the second-generation Almera differed from its predecessor with smoother and more curved lines. For Europe, this generation of Almera was produced at the Sunderland factory, which had opened in 1986 and produced the Micra, Primera and originally the Bluebird.

The N16 Almera is based on Nissan's global MS platform, which was Nissan's first new platform to be developed after the partnership with Renault. The MS platform is also the base for the P12 Primera and Almera Tino.

The second-generation Almera was available in three different body styles, a three- or five-door hatch and a four-door saloon with 1.5 and 1.8 Nissan QG engine series petrol engines as well as a 2.2 direct injection turbodiesel (110 bhp) (YD22DDT) or common-rail turbodiesel (136 bhp) (YD22DDTi). Almeras can be also equipped with 1.5 common-rail turbodiesel (dCi) from the Renault Mégane II – Nissan had recently ventured with Renault and the Almera's diesel engine was one of the first instances of Nissan and Renaults sharing mechanicals. Early versions of the 1.5-litre engine were fitted with a mechanical throttle, which was later replaced by a drive-by-wire electronic throttle.

The Almera five-door hatchback was exported from the UK to Australia and New Zealand and sold as part of the Nissan Pulsar (N16) lineup in these countries. The Almera saloon is based on the Bluebird Sylphy, but has a different front end.

While the previous generation Almera was considered spacious for its class, the N16 Almera was noted to be lacking in rear passenger legroom due to a slightly shorter than category average  wheelbase.

Facelift 

In 2003, the Almera was facelifted with updated styling, retuned suspension, new engines and an updated interior.

First, the Almera's MacPherson strut front suspension and multi-link rear suspension (Nissan's name for its double lateral link twist beam suspension) had been retuned. This resulted in a quieter ride and a reduction in the amount of rear bump-through experienced when heavily laden, improving high-speed stability, driving dynamics and making the car more controllable after an emergency manoeuver. The new suspension tuning also proved to produce almost no body roll on tight turns. Overall, Nissan said, the Almera had slightly firmer damper settings and marginally stiffer spring ratings; though there had been no loss of ride comfort or increase in noise levels in normal motoring. The suspension revisions had been executed in such a way as to only come into play at the upper edge of the dynamic envelope.

The facelift also included new chrome, projector-style headlights that were set in a titanium-coloured surround with separate lights for main and low beams set behind an enlarged translucent cover. The front bumper had an integrated engine air intake that ran almost the full width of the car while a honeycomb mesh grille added visual benefits to the frontal image. Some models also got small circular fog lights.

The interior of the facelifted Almera had also been redesigned with better quality materials and a large colour or monochrome centre screen which controlled all of the car's functions (climate control, CD player and trip computer) was fitted to most models apart from S and Pulse. Higher trim levels also included Nissan's Bird-eye GPS system. ESP (Electronic Stability Program) was fitted to SE, SVE and the range topping SXE (which also got a switch to turn the ESP on or off).

Additionally there was a change to the diesel model lineup. Nissan introduced new version of Common Rail 2.2 Diesel with 6-speed gearbox.

Production 
The facelifted Almera was built in Sunderland, Tyne and Wear, UK, and exported to parts of the Asia-Pacific where it was sold as the Nissan Pulsar. In 2006 the second-generation Almera reached its sixth year of production but was still selling strongly worldwide. It was also sold in Mexico in three versions: a five-door manual five-speed, a five-door automatic three-speed "Comfort" model and a three-door "Sport" version equipped with side curtain air bags, fog lamps and a five-speed manual transmission.

The Almera finished production on 28 November 2007, but it was not instantly replaced. The Tiida was introduced in several countries as a replacement model throughout 2007 and 2008; although it has yet to be officially imported to the United Kingdom (where the Qashqai crossover is the only successor model on offer), it has been available there through the Arnold Clark dealership network since March 2009 with models sourced from the Republic of Ireland. There were several Almeras registered in 2008 in Ireland despite production ending in 2007.

Third generation (N17; 2011) 

The N17 Almera was first introduced in China at the Guangzhou Auto Show in December 2010, where it was marketed as the Nissan Sunny. It went on sale in January 2011. Based on the company's global V platform, the model was touted as a saloon for the global market, as it was gradually marketed across 170 countries with assemblies conducted in numerous American, African, and Asian countries.

In October 2011, Nissan debuted the model in Thailand as the Almera. It was positioned as an entry-level saloon for the Eco Car programme in Thailand, requiring for a 1.2-litre engine to be adopted. The Almera name is also used for the model in Malaysia, the Philippines, Indonesia, Singapore, Australia, Ghana, Kenya, Mauritius, South Africa, and Nigeria.

In the Americas, it is badged as the Nissan Versa. It went on sale in North America in July 2011, and in Brazil in October 2011.

The Sunny nameplate is also used in India, Vietnam, and various Middle Eastern countries. Under the joint venture established with Renault, the model was also marketed as the Renault Scala in India between 2012 and 2017, featuring minor redesigns.

After the release of the succeeding N18 model, the N17 saloon continued to be produced in several countries. In India, since 2020 the vehicle is no longer sold in the country, instead it is solely produced for export to GCC countries as the Sunny Classic. The model is also continued to be produced in Mexico where it is marketed as the Nissan V-Drive since 2019 to distinguish it with the N18 Versa. The V-Drive nameplate was also used in Brazil for the same purpose until its end of production in the country in September 2021. In Malaysia, the model is also sold alongside its successor as the Almera Black Series. Production of the N17 Sunny ended in China since 2019 without any successor.

Markets

Japan 
The Japanese-market model was released as the Nissan Latio on 5 October 2012. Its release was delayed due to power shortages in Japan caused by the 2011 Tōhoku earthquake and tsunami. It was offered with three trim levels. The Latio was discontinued in Japan on 26 December 2016 due to poor sales.

Southeast Asia 
The Thai-specification model was released as the Almera on 7 October 2011 as part of the Eco Car programme.

The Almera was also built in Santa Rosa, Laguna, Philippines. Other Asian countries receive the Almera, including Malaysia and Singapore where it was offered with the 1.5-litre HR15DE engine, mated with either a four-speed automatic or a five-speed manual transmission.

In Indonesia, the Almera was used only as a taxi fleet and was not sold for private consumers, citing low demand for supermini saloons in the country.

In Malaysia, the model is sold as the Almera and was launched in October 2012. Three variants were offered: E (manual and auto), V (auto only) and VL (auto only). All variants are powered by the 1.5-litre HR15DE engine. The facelift N17 Almera was launched in Malaysia in January 2015.

India 
In India, the vehicle was marketed as the Sunny and was introduced in September 2011. Renault marketed a modified version as the Renault Scala, which was launched in August 2012. It was discontinued in May 2020, alongside the Micra supermini, due to both cars not being compliant with India's Bharat Stage VI emissions standards, while production continues for exports.

Australia 
The Australian model was released as the Almera in August 2012. The model range is powered by a 1.5-litre petrol straight-four engine. Sales were low, with a high proportion of sales to fleet and rental car buyers. Nissan Australia discontinued the Almera in July 2014. Trim levels available were the entry-level ST with a five-speed manual or optional four-speed automatic and the automatic-only TI specification.

Americas 
The US-spec model was unveiled at the 2011 New York International Auto Show as the second generation Nissan Versa. The fuel economy is estimated to be  city and  highway with the CVT-equipped model. In the US, the Versa saloon went on sale in August 2011. It was considered to be the least-expensive new car in the US market in 2013.

For the 2015 model year, the Versa received its facelift, with redesigned tail lights and larger headlights. The model was also sold in Latin America as the Versa, also with a 1.6-litre petrol engine.

It was succeeded by the Nissan Micra in 2014 for the Canadian market; the Versa was discontinued there due to slow sales.

In 2016, the Versa was positioned as the replacement of the discontinued Nissan Sunny B13 (known locally as Tsuru). As the result, the Versa became in 2017 the best-selling car in Mexico. In Mexico and Latin America, the N17 Versa was renamed as V-Drive since 2019 to avoid confusion with the new generation Versa launched in October 2019, dropping the Sense and Advance trim lines.

On 25 August 2021, the V-Drive was updated for the Mexican market, incorporating six airbags and stability control as standard.

U.S. Versa annual changes, 2012–2019 

 2012

All-new. Models available are the S (five-speed manual or CVT transmissions offered), SV (CVT only) and SL (CVT only). All are powered by the HR16DE 1.6 engine. Prices range from US$10,990 for the five-speed S to $15,560 for the top-line SL. For this first year, only the SL can be had with a split-folding rear seat. Calendar-year sales in the U.S. reached 113,327 units.

 2013

Enhancements are made to CVT-equipped models (low-rolling resistance tires, air intake guide, rear spoiler and air deflectors) allowing cars so equipped to reach 40 miles per gallon in highway driving. A four-speed automatic transmission becomes available for the base S saloon; the previous S with CVT is renamed the S Plus, and adds standard cruise control. New features are added to SV and SL models. Billed as America's best-selling entry saloon, Nissan sold 117,352 Versas for calendar 2013.

 2014

Trim upgrades for SV and SL models are made for the 2014 model year. Several new features are added to those models as well.

 2015

The 2015 model featured an updated exterior appearance and interior enhancements, along with more new features. Bluetooth phone connectivity is now standard across the board. Nissan sold 144,528 Versas in the U.S. for calendar year 2015, a 3.4% increase over 2014.

 2016

S saloons receive rear stereo speakers (previously these had only front door speakers). Additionally, body-coloured exterior mirrors became standard on all models, and the SL gained a leather-wrapped steering wheel. For calendar year 2016, Nissan sold 132,214 Versas in the U.S., down 8.5% from 2015.

 2017

The SV Special Edition package was made available, and adds 15-inch alloy wheels, fog lights, leather-wrapped steering wheel, upgraded audio system with five-inch colour display, SiriusXM satellite radio, Bluetooth streaming audio, hands-free text messaging assistant and backup camera, among other features, all for $500 over the standard SV's $15,720 price tag. After the beginning of the model year, the 4-speed automatic transmission option was removed from the S (base) saloon. For the first time since its 2012 introduction, Versa U.S. sales fell in 2017, to 106,772 units; a 19.2% decrease from 2016 levels.

 2018

The SL model, pushbutton start and Sandstone interior colour are discontinued. Only minor changes are made to the remaining S, S Plus and SV. The SV Special Edition package becomes the top-of-the-line. All now have adjustable front seat head restraints and variable-speed intermittent windshield wipers. In mid-model-year, the "2018.5" Versas – all models - added a 7" touchscreen stereo head unit and rear-view monitor as standard equipment. The new system included streaming Bluetooth audio, Siri Eyes Free, and USB/Aux inputs on S and S Plus models. Through August 2018, U.S. Versa sales had reached 54,301, a 23.8% drop from 2017.

 2019

Nissan's Intelligent Key (pushbutton starting) system returns, now as part of the SV Special Edition package, which also added to its stereo system NissanConnect, Apple CarPlay and Android Auto, SiriusXM Satellite Radio, Bluetooth hands-free phone and text messaging.

Safety 

Depending on regions, the N17 model can be equipped with up to six airbags.

Latin NCAP
The Versa in its most basic Latin American configuration with 2 airbags and no ESC received 3 stars for adult occupants and 2 stars for toddlers from Latin NCAP in 2016.

ASEAN NCAP
 ASEAN NCAP -

IIHS
The 2019 Versa was tested by the IIHS:

Fourth generation (N18; 2019)

Markets

United States 
The fourth generation-N18 saloon was unveiled on 12 April 2019 at the Rock the Ocean's Tortuga Music Festival in Fort Lauderdale, Florida, United States, as the third generation Versa saloon, one week before its public debut at the 2019 New York International Auto Show. Sales began in August 2019, for the 2020 model year. It is based on the Renault–Nissan CMF-B, which is shared with the Renault Clio V, Renault Captur, fifth-generation Micra and the Kicks.

In the United States, the third-generation Versa is available in three trim levels: S, SV and SR. The new Versa include the Nissan Safety Shield of driver assistance technologies as standard equipment, as well as push-button ignition, 7-inch touchscreen audio system, cruise control, power windows, and power door locks. Up-level Versa trims offer features such as aluminium-alloy wheels, Apple CarPlay and Android Auto smartphone integration, SiriusXM Satellite Radio, a LCD instrument cluster display, LED daytime running accent lamps, Nissan Intelligent Key system, and combination Primatex (leatherette) and cloth seating surfaces.

The facelifted Versa was unveiled on 10 October 2022 for the 2023 model year. It features a redesigned front fascia and grille, and a new S Plus package, which adds Apple CarPlay and Android Auto to the S trim, was introduced.

Canada 
In the Canadian market, the Versa has been on sale since November 2020. It was unveiled at the 2020 Canadian International Motor Show in Toronto. It replaces the Micra when Nissan discontinued it after the 2019 model year. It also marks the return of the Versa saloon in Canada since it was discontinued in 2014. In Canada, it is offered in four variants: S MT, S CVT, SV CVT, and SR CVT. All variants come with a 1.6 litre non-turbocharged engine.

Mexico 
The third generation Versa saloon came to the Mexican market on 1 October 2019. It comes in four trim lines: Sense, Advance, Exclusive, and Platinum. The previous generation Versa, albeit with fewer trim lines, continues to be sold in Mexico and in Latin America under the name of V-Drive.

Thailand 
The fourth generation Almera was launched in Thailand on 14 November 2019 In Thailand, the Almera is offered in 5 grades: S Turbo, E Turbo, EL Turbo, V Turbo and VL Turbo. All models are powered by the HRA0 turbocharged 1.0-litre engine.

The Almera Sportech was launched on 2 June 2021. It is available in V Turbo and VL Turbo grades.

The limited-edition Almera Sportech-X was launched on 8 August 2022 and is available in VL grade. Over 300 units were made.

Malaysia 
In Malaysia, the Almera is offered in three trims: VL, VL Premium and VL Tech. All trim levels comes with Autonomous Emergency Braking as standard which includes Intelligent Forward Collision Warning (IFCW) and Intelligent Forward Emergency Braking (IFEB). All trims are powered by the HRA0 turbocharged 1.0 L engine. According to Edaran Tan Chong Malaysia (TCMA), the Almera on offered in Malaysia has the highest specification in the ASEAN market.

Brunei 
In Brunei, the Almera was officially launched on 27 February 2020. The car is only available with the 1.0-litre turbocharger engine and Xtronic CVT in this market, in two different trims: Turbo Standard and the better equipped Turbo Premium.

Vietnam 
In Vietnam, the Almera was launched on 4 August 2021 and is sold in three grades; E Turbo MT, EL Turbo CVT, and VL Turbo CVT. The Almera in Vietnam is fully imported from Thailand.

Philippines 
In the Philippines, it was launched on 8 October 2021 and was initially offered in three grades: EL Turbo (5-speed manual), VE Turbo (5-speed manual and CVT) and VL N-Sport Turbo (CVT only). All models are offered with the 1.0-litre turbocharged engine. The Almera is now imported from Thailand instead of being built locally as Nissan stopped production in the country.

In January 2023, the VL N-Sport Turbo grade was removed from the lineup. This was replaced by the lower priced VE N-Sport trim. Nissan further decontented the Almera by removing four of the six airbags that it had been fitted with before.

Middle East 
The Sunny was also launched for Middle Eastern markets at the Dubai International Motor Show in November 2019.

Gallery

Safety
The Versa has front disc brakes.

IIHS

2021
The 2021 Versa was tested by the IIHS:

2022
The 2022 Versa was tested by the IIHS:

Other versions

B10 (2006–2010) 

In 2002, Renault Samsung Motors in South Korea started manufacturing the Renault Samsung SM3, sharing the Nissan Bluebird Sylphy N16 basis used for the Almera. It was facelifted in 2005, and from April 2006 it started selling as the Almera Classic in Ukraine and Russia, as the Almera B10 in Central America, Venezuela and Ecuador, and as the Sunny B10 in the Middle East. In Colombia, Mexico, Libya and Egypt, the car has been sold as the Renault Scala and in Chile as the Renault Samsung SM3.

G11 (2012–2018) 

In Russia, the Nissan Bluebird Sylphy G11 was marketed as the Nissan Almera. It received its world premiere at the 2012 Moscow International Automobile Salon on 29 August 2012, and uses the same design as the Bluebird Sylphy but a redesigned dashboard interior, adapted from the first-generation Dacia Logan. It has a 1.6-litre petrol engine (75 kW), with a five-speed manual or a four-speed automatic transmission, and was manufactured locally at the AvtoVAZ plant since December 2012. Sales began in April 2013 and stopped in October 2018 just a month after the Pulsar was discontinued.

References

External links 

Almera
ASEAN NCAP small family cars
Euro NCAP small family cars
Latin NCAP small family cars
Front-wheel-drive vehicles
Cars introduced in 1995
2000s cars
2010s cars
2020s cars
Vehicles with CVT transmission
Cars of Brazil